Saharanpur Assembly constituency  is one of the 403 constituencies of the Uttar Pradesh Legislative Assembly, India. It is a part of the Saharanpur district and one of the five assembly constituencies in the Saharanpur Lok Sabha constituency. Saharanpur Assembly constituency came into existence in 1955 as a result of the "Final Order DC (1953–1955)". The extant and serial number of this constituency was last defined in "Delimitation of Parliamentary and Assembly Constituencies Order, 2008".

Wards / Areas
Saharanpur assembly constituency comprises the following Wards / areas.

Members of the Legislative Assembly

Election results

2022

17th Vidhan Sabha: 2017 Assembly

16th Vidhan Sabha: 2012 Assembly Elections

15th Vidhan Sabha: 2007 Assembly Elections

See also

Saharanpur district
Saharanpur Lok Sabha constituency
Government of Uttar Pradesh
List of Vidhan Sabha constituencies of Uttar Pradesh
Uttar Pradesh
Uttar Pradesh Legislative Assembly

References

External links
 

Assembly constituencies of Uttar Pradesh
Politics of Saharanpur district
Constituencies established in 1955
1955 establishments in Uttar Pradesh